Marcon is a full-spectrum fantasy and science fiction convention based in Columbus, Ohio, and was on Easter weekend in 2013 but moved to Mother's Day weekend starting in 2014. It is now operated by the Columbus-based Science Oriented Literature, Art, and Education Foundation, a non-profit educational corporation. The name was originally short for "March Convention," with the convention mascot the "March Hare," affectionately named "Marconi". After the date of the convention moved away from March, the name was re-designated as "Multiple Alternative Realities Convention".

Marcon offers a dozen tracks of programming in art, costuming, fan, filk, literary, media, and science, as well as events and displays including a masquerade, art show, dealers room, multiple 24-hour video tracks,  of gaming space, and at least one dance. Marcon runs a children's track of programming that has included independent filmmakers helping the kids create their own movies (The Curse of Monster X, Return of the Red Shirts) and many hands-on art, costuming, and science programs. It is the oldest and largest science fiction convention in the state of Ohio.

It was announced after the 2021 MARCon that the 57th MARCon in 2022 would be the last. However, in August of 2022, Tony Gillian of Chillichote, Ohio, has revived the convention and will take over as the chairman for 2023.

"Marcon Ballroom", a filk song by Anne Passovoy about an incident with hotel management failing to adjust to the needs of fandom, was awarded a Pegasus Award as "Best Classic Filk Song" in 2005.

History

2020s

Marcon 2023
May 26–28, 2023, Columbus, Ohio.

After Marcon 57 in 2022, new management has taken over working with SOLAE, the registered charity organization that owns Marcon. The convention will return to Memorial Day weekend, with dates May 26–28, 2023.  Guests for Marcon 2023 will be:
David Weber, Author Guest of Honor
Jordan Breeding, Content Creator Guest
Chaz Kemp, Artist Guest of Honor
Carolyn Kay

Other guests remain to be announced.

Marcon 57
May 6–8, 2022, Worthington, Ohio.

It was announced after MARCon 56 in 2021 that the 57th MARCon in 2022 would be the last.  Guests of Honor for Marcon 2022 were:
Mary Turzillo, Author Guest of Honor
Mitchell Bentley, Artist Guest of Honor
Tom Smith, Filk Guest of Honor
Special Music Guests The Harp Twins

Marcon 56

September 3–5, 2021, in Crowne Plaza Columbus North in Worthington, Ohio, with 
Author Guest of Honor Carrie Vaughn
Artist Guest of Honor Sara Felix
Science Guest of Honor Wolfgang Rumpf
filk Guests of Honor The Blibbering Humdingers.

2010s

Marcon 55

Marcon 55 had been scheduled for May 8–10, 2020, in Worthington, Ohio, but it was postponed and then cancelled mid-March 2020 by order of the Governor of Ohio, who cancelled all public gatherings due to the COVID-19 pandemic. It was then held as a virtual convention in May 2020, chaired by Kim Williams.

Marcon 54

May 10–12, 2019, Crowne Plaza Columbus North in Worthington, Ohio.

Author GoH: Charles Gannon
Artist GoH: John Picacio
Editor GoH: Rebecca Moesta
Science GoH: Bob and Connie Trembley
Filk GoH: The Hopeful Romantics
Media GoH: David Gerrold
Author Special Guest: Kevin J. Anderson
Local Artist Special Guest: Donna Estep
Cosplay Special Guest: Lady of Rohan
Author Music Guest The Harp Twins

Marcon 53

May 11–13, 2018, Hyatt Regency Columbus

 Legendary Artist Guest of Honor: Larry Elmore
 Legendary Filk Guest of Honor: Juanita Coulson
 Fan Guest of Honor: Todd Cameron Hamilton
 Author Guest of Honor: F. Paul Wilson
 Young Adult Author Guest of Honor: Cinda Williams Chima
 Media Guest of Honor: Gary Graham
 Music Guest of Honor: Dandelion Wine
 Artist Guest of Honor: David Lee Pancake
 Cosplay Guest of Honor: Alexa Heart 
 Cosplay Guest of Honor:  Mogchelle Cosplay
 Guest of Honor: Charles Xavier Conley
 Miniatures Guest of Honor: Shoshie Bauer
 Featured Author: Walter Jon Williams
 Featured Author: Eric Flint
 Featured Author: Walter Hunt
 Featured Artist: Andy Hopp
 Featured Cosplayer: Nerd Girl Cosplay
 Featured Cosplayer: Brit Bliss

Marcon 52

May 10–12, 2017, Hyatt Regency Columbus

Guests of Honor:
 Jacqueline Carey, 
 Kristen Simmons, 
 Charles Urbach, 
 Talis Kimberley, 
 Alexa Heart, 
 Phil and Kaja Foglio, 
 Jason Hardy, 
 Jason Marsden

Marcon 51
May 6–8, 2016, Hyatt Regency Columbus
 Seanan McGuire – Author Guest of Honor
 Mogchelle Cosplay – Cosplay Guest of Honor
 S. J. Tucker – Music Guest of Honor

Marcon 50
May 8–10, 2015, Columbus, Ohio

Hosted the Libertarian Futurist Prometheus Award ceremony.

Marcon 49
May 9–11, 2014

Guests of Honor:
 Glen Cook, Heather Dale, Ben Deschamps, Eric Flint

Marcon 48
March 29–31, 2013, Hyatt Regency Columbus.  
 Joe Haldeman – Author Guest of Honor
 Heather Kreiter – Artist Guest of Honor
 Gay Haldeman – Fan Guest of Honor
 Jeff Dee – Gaming Guest of Honor
 Toyboat – Filk Guest of Honor
 Brian Keene – Special Guest
 F. Paul Wilson – Special Guest

Marcon 47
April 6–8, 2012
 Tamora Pierce – Author Guest of Honor
 Sarah Clemens – Artist Guest of Honor
 Paula Guran – Editor Guest of Honor
 Dr. Bradley Lepper – Science Guest of Honor
 Erica Neely – Filk Guest of Honor
 Manu Intiraymi – Media Guest of Honor

Marcon 46
May 27–29, 2011
 F. Paul Wilson – Author Guest of Honor
 Eric Flint – Author Guest of Honor
 Harry Turtledove – Theme Guest of Honor
 John Palencar – Artist Guest of Honor
 Leslie Fish – Filk Guest of Honor
 Brent Keith – Gaming Guest of Honor
 The Extraordinary Contraptions – Special SteamPunk Music Guest
 Marc G. Millis – Special Science Guest

Marcon 45
May 28–30, 2010
 Wen Spencer – Author Guest of Honor
 Billy Tackett – Artist Guest of Honor
 Seanan McGuire – Filk Guest of Honor
 Central Ohio Paranormal Society – Special Theme Guest
 Twilight Creations – Gaming Guest of Honor
 Richard Hatch – Media Guest of Honor
 Casey Daniels, Shane Moore, Donnie Dunagan – Special Guests

2000s

Marcon 44
May 22–24, 2009
  Simon R. Green – Author Guest of Honor
  Jordin Kare – Science Guest of Honor
  Patricia McCracken – Artist Guest of Honor
  Chris Conway – Filk Guest of Honor
  David H. Lawrence XVII – Media Guest of Honor
  Samuel Travis Clemmons – Full Spectrum Featured Guest 
  Arnold Blumberg – Featured Guest

Marcon 43
May 23–25, 2008
 Alexander James Adams – Filk Guest of Honor
 Steven Brust – Toastmaster
 Rebecca Forstadt – Anime Guest of Honor
 Kevin Standlee – Fan Guest of Honor
 Sister Sola/Casandra – Costuming Guest of Honor
 Ray van Tilburg – Artist Guest of Honor
 Toni Weisskopf – Editor Guest of Honor
 Hank Reinhardt – Science Guest of Honor:  Mr. Reinhardt died before the convention.  The con-com decided to honor him by keeping him as the Science Guest of Honor.
 Robert Asprin – Author Guest of Honor:  Mr. Asprin died the day before the convention.
 Jody Lynn Nye – Author Guest of Honor:  Due to Mr. Asprin's death Ms. Nye was unable to attend.
 Wizards of the Coast – Gaming Guest of Honor
 Marc Singer – Media Guest of Honor
 Leah Cairns – Media Guest of Honor

Marcon 42
May 25–27, 2007
 Keith R.A. DeCandido – Author Guest of Honor
 Laura Reynolds – Artist Guest of Honor (Prism Studios' griffons & such)
 Timothy Zahn – Toastmaster
 Kevin Sorbo – Media Guest of Honor
 Nancy Janda – Fan Guest of Honor
 Three Weird Sisters – Filk Guests of Honor
 Pierre and Sandy Pettinger – Costuming Guests of Honor
 Looney Labs – Gaming Guests of Honor

Marcon 41
May 26–28, 2006 – approximately 2100 attendees

Guests: 
Author Guest: George R. R. Martin
Artist Guest: Jody Lee
Editor Guest: David G. Hartwell
Media Guest: Eugene Roddenberry Jr.
Costuming Guest: Chris Kramer
Fan Guest: B. J. Mitias
Filk Guest: Dave & Judith Hayman
Steve Lee
Gaming Guest: Pieramyd Productions, Ltd.
Electronic Gaming Guest: EB Games
Toastmaster: Bill Roper

Marcon 40
May 27–29, 2005 – approximately 2100 attendees
 Larry Niven – Author Guest of Honor
 Animal X – Costuming Guest of Honor
 Howard DeVore – Fan Guest of Honor
 Mike Resnick – Toastmaster
 Roger Zelazny – Ghost of Honor
 Tom Smith – Filk Guest of Honor
 Larry Elmore – Artist Guest of Honor
 Richard Hatch – Media Guest of Honor
 Steve Jackson – Gaming Guest of Honor
 Steve Saffel – Editor Guest of Honor
 John Kovalic – Comics Guest of Honor
 Geoffrey A. Landis – Guest of Honor
 John Levene – Media Guest of Honor

Marcon 39
May 28–30, 2004 – approximately 2000 attendees
  Laurell K. Hamilton – Author Guest of Honor
 Bob Eggleton – Artist Guest of Honor
  Cecilia Tan – Dark Fantasy Guest of Honor
 Ellen Datlow – Editor Guest of Honor
 Julie Zetterberg – Costuming Guest of Honor
 Cynthia McQuillin and Dr. Jane Robinson – Filk Guests of Honor
 Bjo and John Trimble – Fan Tuests of Honor
 Hugh S. Gregory – Science Guest of Honor
 Twilight Creations – Gaming Guest of Honor
 J. D. Lees – Godzilla Special Guest
 Dr. Demento – Toastmaster

Marcon 38
May 23–25, 2003 – approximately 1800 attendees
  J. Gregory Keyes – Author Guest of Honor
  Richard Biggs – Media Guest of Honor
  Eugene Roddenberry Jr. – Media Guest of Honor
  Kenny Baker – Media Guest of Honor
 Bill and Brenda Sutton – Filk Guests of Honor
 Judith and Dave Hayman – Featured Filkers

Marcon 37
May 24–26, 2002 – approximately 2000 attendees
 Catherine Asaro – Science Guest of Honor
 Zander Nyrond – Filk Guest of Honor

Marcon 36
May 25–27, 2001 – approximately 3600 attendees
 Hosted 2001 Prometheus Award presentations and LFSCon
 James P. Gordon – Prometheus Award Guest of Honor
 Doctor Demento –  Toastmaster
 Robert Jordan– Author Guest of Honor
 Ellisa Mitchell – Artist Guest of Honor
 Ray and Barb VanTilburg – Fan Guests of Honor
 Gary Lockwood and Peter Woodward – Media Guests of Honor
 Karen Bergquist – Costuming Guest of Honor
 Bob and Ann Passavoy – Filk Guests of Honor
 Geoffrey A. Landis – Science Guest of Honor
 Hex Games –  Guests of Honor
 Poul and Karen Anderson – Grand Master Guests of Honor

Marcon 35
May 26–28, 2000, Hyatt Regency Hotel and Columbus Convention Center, Columbus, Ohio – Approximately 2400 attendees

Guest of Honor:
 Janny Wurts and Don Maitz
 Josef and Kit Matulich
 Maryann and Kevin Siembieda – Gaming Guests of Honor
 Richard Chevolleau and Leni Parker – Media Guests of Honor
 Doctor Demento
 Steve MacDonald – Filk Guest of Honor

1990s

Marcon 34
Hyatt Regency, Columbus, Ohio,
May 7–9 1999 – Approximately 2800 attendees
 David Drake – Guest of Honor
 Erin McKee – Artist Guest of Honor
 Steve Saffel – Editor Guest of Honor
 Syntax – Filk Guest of Honor

Marcon 33
1998 – Approximately 2200 attendees
 Ookla the Mok (band) – Filk Guest of Honor

Marcon 32
May 9–11, 1997 – approximately 2800 attendees
 Harry Turtledove – Author Guest of Honor
 Juanita Coulson – Filk Guest of Honor

Marcon 31
1996
 Joey Shoji – Filk Guest of Honor

Marcon 30
1995
 Kathy Mar – Filk Guest of Honor
Many of the cast of Babylon 5 and J. Michael Straczynski

Marcon 29
1994
 Philip Jose Farmer – Science Fiction Guest of Honor
 Barbara Hambly – Fantasy Guest of Honor
 Boris Vallejo – Artist Guest of Honor
 Forry J Ackerman – Media Guest of Honor
 Dr. Jane Robinson – Filk Guest of Honor
 David Ivey – Costuming Guest of Honor
 Barry B. Longyear – Toastmaster

Marcon 28
1993
 Michael Longcor – Filk Guest of Honor
 Tom Smith – Toastmaster
 Denny O'Neil – Comic Book Guest of Honor
 Mike Resnick – Author Guest of Honor
 Julius Schwartz – Super Guest of Honor
 Ray Van Tiberg – Artist Guest of Honor
 Animal X – Special Contuming Guest
 Jane Yolen – Author Guest of Honor

Marcon 27
May 22–25, 1992
 Roger Zelazny – Author Guest of Honor
 Orson Scott Card – Author Guest of Honor
 Bill and Brenda Sutton – Toastmasters
 Lois McMaster Bujold – Special Featured Guest of Honor
 Randy Asplund-Faith – Artist Guest of Honor
 Sue & Steve Francis – Fan Guests of Honor
 Richard Tucholka – Gaming Guest of Honor

Marcon 26
1991
 C. J. Cherryh – Author Guest of Honor
 Juanita Coulson – Filk Guest of Honor
 Lois McMaster Bujold – Author Guest of Honor
 Rowena Morrill – Artist Guest of Honor
 "Moonwulf" Michael Longcor – Toastmaster
 Richard Spelman – Fan Guest of Honor

Marcon XXV
1990
 George R. R. Martin – Author Guest of Honor
 Melinda Snodgrass – Author Guest of Honor
 Gahan Wilson – Artist Guest of Honor
 Murray Porath – Filk Guest of Honor
 Chris Claremont – Special Comic Book Guest of Honor
 Edward Bryant – Featured Guest
 John J. Miller – Featured Guest
 Stephen Leigh – Featured Guest
 Walter Jon Williams – Featured Guest
 Howard Waldrop – Featured Guest
 Walton Simons – Featured Guest
 Lois McMaster Bujold – Featured Guest

1980s

Marcon XXIV
1989 – 1244 attendees
 Hal Clement – Guest of Honor
 Todd Cameron Hamilton – Artist Guest of Honor
 Barry and Sally Childs-Helton – Filking Guests of Honor
 Steve Jackson – Gaming Guest of Honor

Marcon XXIII
1988 – 1050 attendees
 David Brin – Guest of Honor
 Michael Whelan – Artist Guest of Honor
 Bill Sutton – Toastmaster
 Kevin Siembieda – Gaming Guest of Honor

Marcon XXII
1987 – 960 attendees
 Michael P. Kube-McDowell – Guest of Honor
 David Mattingly – Artist Guest of Honor
 Juanita Coulson – Toastmaster
 Kevin Siembieda – Gaming Guest of Honor
 Tom Savini – Media Guest of Honor
 Bill Roper – Fan Guest of Honor

Marcon XXI
1986 – 1056 attendees
 Roger Zelazny – Guest of Honor
 Kelly Freas – Artist Guest of Honor
 Andrew J. Offutt – Toastmaster
 Bill Maraschiello – Con Musician

Marcon XX
1985 – 723 attendees
 Larry Niven – Guest of Honor
 Carl Lundgren -Artist Guest of Honor
 Bill Maraschiello – Con Musician

Marcon XIX
1984 – 592 attendees
 C. J. Cherryh – Guest of Honor
 Todd Cameron Hamilton – Artist Guest of Honor

Marcon XVIII
1983 – 440 attendees
 James P. Hogan – Guest of Honor

Marcon XVII
1982 – 379 attendees
 Hal Clement – Guest of Honor
 Juanita Coulson – Toastmaster
 Buck Coulson – Fan Guest of Honor

Marcon XVI
1981 – 426 attendees
 Andrew J. Offutt – Guest of Honor

Marcon XV
1980 – 383 attendees
 L. Sprague de Camp – Guest of Honor
 Catherine Crook de Camp – Toastmaster

1970s

Marcon XIV
1979 – 372 attendees
 Katherine Kurtz – Guest of Honor
 Wilson (Bob) Tucker – Toastmaster

Marcon XIII
1978 – 264 attendees
 A. Bertram Chandler – Guest of Honor

Marcon XII
1977 – 222 attendees
 Alan Dean Foster – Guest of Honor

Marcon XI
1976 – 212 attendees
 Joe Haldeman – Guest of Honor

Marcon X
1975 – Approximately 185 attendees
 James E. Gunn – Guest of Honor

Marcon IX
1974 – Approximately 170 attendees
 Hal Clement – Guest of Honor
 Andrew J. Offutt – Toastmaster

Marcon VIII
1973 – Approximately 100 attendees
 Anne McCaffrey – Guest of Honor

Marcon VII
1972 – Approximately 150 attendees
 Roger Zelazny – Guest of Honor

Marcon VI
1971 – Approximately 120 attendees
 Lester del Rey – Guest of Honor

Marcon V
1970 – Approximately 105 attendees
 Gordon R. Dickson – Guest of Honor

1960s

Marcon IV
1969 – Approximately 100 attendees
 Terry Carr – Guest of Honor

Marcon III
1968 (First time in Columbus) – Approximately 85 attendees
 Frederik Pohl – Guest of Honor

Marcon II
1967 (Toledo) – Approximately 60 attendees

Marcon I
1966 (Toledo) – Approximately 20 attendees
Roger Zelazny – Unofficial Guest of Honor

References

External links
 Marcon official website

Science fiction conventions in the United States
Science fiction organizations